Emerson Knives, Inc. is an American company that produces knives and related products. It was founded in 1996 by custom knifemaker Ernest Emerson in an effort to mass-produce his folding knife designs for the U.S. Military and collector markets.

History
In February 1996, custom Knifemaker Ernest Emerson and his wife, Mary, founded Emerson Knives, Inc. (also referred to as EKI) in Torrance, California to manufacture knives on a larger scale than a custom knifemaker was capable. This new company would be a distinct entity from his Specwar lineup of custom knives, although several of Emerson's custom designs have made their way into production. Four years after starting this venture, Emerson sold an entire year's worth of production in four hours at the SHOT (Shooting Hunting and Outdoor Trade) Show in January 2000.

Products

Emerson Knives primarily manufactures tactical folding knives utilizing the Walker linerlock.  EKI most commonly machines blades of Crucible's 154CM steel by using the stock-removal method.  Small runs of knives have been produced utilizing steels such as CPM S30V steel, CPM S35VN, and Titanium with a carbide edge.  The handles are constructed with titanium liners, G10 fiberglass scales, and a G10 backspacer.  Since 2009 EKI has been using a stainless steel liner on the non-locking side in order to keep costs down.

The most common models are the CQC-7, Commander, SARK, Karambit, Raven, and the SPECWAR.  The majority of Emerson's folding knives are equipped with the Wave: a hook on the spine of the blade (originally designed as a blade catcher) which, when snagged on the edge of the pocket or sheath causes the knife blade to open as it is drawn. Emerson called this innovation the Wave and secured a patent for it in March 1999.

The company makes a small variety of fixed blade knives.  These models include the Police Utility Knife (PUK), Emerson's version of Fred Perrin's La Griffe, and a dagger.

Production knives made by the company differ from Emerson's custom knives by the logo on the blade which reads "Emerson Knives, Inc."  Sometimes the model number is found on the blade with a date and a serial number.  Additionally, custom knives made by Emerson have dual titanium liners and handles made from linen micarta with titanium bolsters.  Emerson Knives Inc.'s primary focus is on the military and police markets.  There is a large secondary market of collectors as there is with most knife companies.

In May 2013, a non-custom factory-made Emerson CQC-7 knife carried by the Navy SEAL who served as point man on the mission to kill or capture Osama bin Laden was auctioned off for charity, netting over $35,000.

List of knife models

Collaborations
Emerson Knives has collaborated with other companies on knife-related projects. In 2002 Emerson Knives collaborated with Gerber Knives to create both companies' first automatic opening knife, the Gerber-Emerson Alliance. In that same year, Emerson Knives collaborated with SureFire Flashlights by making an exclusive CQC8 (Banana Knife) numbered and marked with the SureFire logo and sold with an identically numbered Emerson-marked Centurion C2 CombatLight. In 2005 Emerson Knives collaborated with Andy Prisco, the CEO of the American Tomahawk Company, to produce the CQC-T Tomahawk. This tomahawk features a curved head machined from 4140 steel with a rear spike and a lightweight fiberglass handle. Although not made by Emerson, the tomahawk was designed by him.  In September 2010, Emerson Knives announced a collaboration with Pro-Tech Knives to produce an automatic opening version of the CQC-7.  In November 2010, Emerson's Roadhouse Knife won Knives Illustrated's American Made Knife of 2010-2011 Award at the Spirit of Steel Show in Knoxville, TN.  According to Emerson, the knife will be used as a prop on the Sons of Anarchy Television Show.

References

External links

Patent for the WAVE

Knife manufacturing companies
Manufacturing companies established in 1996